The name Georges was used for two tropical cyclones in the Atlantic Ocean. 

 Hurricane Georges (1980) – Category 1 hurricane looped across the north Atlantic Ocean without causing any reported damage.
 Hurricane Georges (1998) – Category 4 hurricane that wrought death and destruction across the Caribbean and Gulf of Mexico.

The name "Georges" was retired after the hurricane in 1998 and was replaced by "Gaston" in 2004.

See also
 Tropical Storm George
 Hurricane Georgette

Atlantic hurricane set index articles